Thermopsis gracilis is a species of flowering plant in the legume family known by the common name slender goldenbanner.

It is native to the western United States from Washington state to northern California. 

It grows in open mountain forests and other habitats.

Description
Thermopsis gracilis is a rhizomatous perennial herb producing a fuzzy-haired, hollow stem up to a meter (3 ft.) tall. Each leaf has three leaflets as well as stipules that look like leaflets.

The inflorescence is a raceme of many bright yellow pealike flowers each measuring 2 centimeters long or more. The fruit is a leathery legume pod containing the seeds.

References

External links
CalFlora Database: Thermopsis gracilis
Washington Burke Museum
Thermopsis gracilis - Photo gallery

Sophoreae
Flora of the Northwestern United States
Flora of California
Flora of the Cascade Range
Flora of the Klamath Mountains
Natural history of the California Coast Ranges
Flora without expected TNC conservation status